The 1987 Portuguese Grand Prix was a Formula One motor race held at Estoril on 20 September 1987. It was the twelfth race of the 1987 Formula One World Championship. It was the 16th Portuguese Grand Prix and the fourth to be held at Estoril.

The race was won by Frenchman Alain Prost, driving a McLaren-TAG, after he started from third position. Austrian driver Gerhard Berger took pole position in his Ferrari and led for most of the race, until he spun with three laps remaining. Prost duly went through to take his 28th Grand Prix victory, surpassing Jackie Stewart's all-time record; he also achieved his 54th podium finish, equalling Niki Lauda's record. Berger finished second, some 20 seconds behind Prost, with Drivers' Championship leader, Brazilian Nelson Piquet, third in his Williams-Honda.

The race was marred by a multi-car collision on the opening lap. Piquet and Michele Alboreto (Ferrari F1/87) collided at the start, with Derek Warwick (Arrows A10), Satoru Nakajima (Lotus 99T), Martin Brundle (Zakspeed 871), Christian Danner (Zakspeed 871), Philippe Alliot (Lola LC87), René Arnoux (Ligier JS29C) and Adrián Campos (Minardi M186) all involved in the ensuing accident. Only Danner was unable to restart as the Zakspeed team had only one usable car which went to Brundle.

With Piquet finishing third ahead of both Mansell and Senna, Piquet expanded his championship points lead to 18 points over Senna and 24 over Mansell.

Classification

Qualifying

Race 
Numbers in brackets refer to positions of normally aspirated entrants competing for the Jim Clark Trophy.

Championship standings after the race

Drivers' Championship standings

Constructors' Championship standings

Jim Clark Trophy standings

Colin Chapman Trophy standings

References

Portuguese Grand Prix
Grand Prix
Portuguese Grand Prix